The following is a list of episodes of the BBC television series Natural World.



Series 1

Series 2

Series 3

Series 4

Series 5

Series 6

Series 7

Series 8

Series 9

Series 10

Series 11

Series 12

Series 13

Series 14

Series 15

Series 16

Series 17

Series 18

Series 19

Series 20

Series 21

Series 22

Series 23

Series 24

Series 25

Series 26

Series 27

Series 28

Series 29

Series 30

Series 31

Series 32

Series 33

Series 34

Series 35

Series 36

Series 37

Series 38

Footnotes

References

External links
List of Natural World episodes

Lists of British non-fiction television series episodes
Lists of documentary television series episodes